This article contains a list of Wikipedia articles about Nepalese politicians by alphabetic order of family name.

A

 Mohammed Aftab Aalam
 Bhim Acharya
 Dilaram Acharya
 Drona Prasad Acharya
 Lekh Nath Acharya
 Mahesh Acharya
Mahadev Bajgai 
 Narahari Acharya
 Shailaja Acharya (born 1944)
 Haribhakta Adhikari
 Khagaraj Adhikari
 Mohan Chandra Adhikari
 Narayan Prasad Adhikari
 Rabindra Prasad Adhikari
 Ram Nath Adhikari
 Shekha Nath Adhikari
 Ghan Shyam Yadav Ahir
 Ram Bachhan Ahir
 Madan Bahadur Amatya
 Salim Miya Ansari
 Urmila Aryal
Back to top

B

 Durga Kumari B.K.
 Kanchan Chandra Bade
 Dilendra Prasad Badu
 Bhagat Bahadur Baduwal
 Raghav Lal Baidya
 Khadgajeet Baral (born 1928)
 Sudarshan Baral
 Dipak Prakash Baskota
 Hari Bahadur Basnet
 Hari Nath Bastola
 Mohan Bahadur Basnet
 Shakti Bahadur Basnet
 Tek Bahadur Basnet
 Damodar Bastakoti
 Gunakhar Basyal
 Mirza Dilshad Beg
 Buddhiram Bhandari
 Damodar Bhandari
 Lila Kumari Bhandari
 Naresh Bhandari
 Sarad Singh Bhandari
 Sharad Singh Bhandari
 Dev Raj Bhar
 Tekendra Prasad Bhatt
 Lekh Raj Bhatta
 Baburam Bhattarai (born 1954)
 Pampha Bhusal (born 1963)
 Narayan Man Bijukchhe (born 1939)
 Khadga Bahadur Bishwakarma (born 1968)
 Gokarna Bista
 Nara Bahadur Bista
 Ram Bahadur Bista
 Post Bahadur Bogati (1953–2014)
 Sabitri Bogati
 Ram Bahadur Bohara
 Sita Devi Boudel
 Raj Bahadur Budha
 Karn Jit Budhathoki
 Keshav Kumar Budhathoki
 Khem Bahadur Bum
 Narendra Bahadur Bum

Back to top

C

 Janak Kumari Chalise
 Binayadhoj Chand
 Nar Bahadur Chand
 Renu Chand
 Gyan Kumari Chantyal
 Dharma Sila Chapagain
 Bir Man Chaudhari
 Dan Bahadur Chaudhari
 Devi Lal Chaudhari
 Krishna Kumar Chaudhari
 Phulmati Devi Chaudhari
 Ramcharan Chaudhari
 Rupa So.Si. Chaudhari
 Smriti Narayan Chaudhari
 Uma Kanta Chaudhari
 Balbir Prasad Chaudhary
 Damodar Chaudhary (died 2010)
 Laxmilal Chaudhary
 Parbati Chaudhary
 Rukmini Chaudhary
 Shanta Chaudhary
 Sushila Chaudhary
 Kamal Prasad Chaulagain
 Tek Bahadur Chokhyal

Back to top

D

 Tirtha Ram Dangol
 Ranju Darshana (born 1996)
 Arzu Rana Deuba (born 1962)
 Sher Bahadur Deuba (born 1946)
 Ek Nath Dhakal (born 1974)
 Janardan Dhakal
 Ramnath Dhakal (1962–2015)
 Nav Raj Dhami
 Ram Hari Dhungel
 Rameshwor Prasad Dhungel
 Pushpa Kamal Dahal

G

 Mahendra Dhoj G.C.
 Bijay Kumar Gachhadar
 Bam Dev Gautam (born 1944)
 Rishikesh Gautam (born 1941)
 Sanjay Gautam
 Shiv Raj Gautam
 Jaypuri Gharti
 Dharma Prasad Ghimire
 Krishna Kishor Ghimire
 Sushma Sharma Ghimire
 Deepak Giri
 Gehendra Giri
 Janak Raj Giri
 Om Prakash Yadav Gulzari
 Bhagwan Das Gupta (1940–1998)
 Brijesh Kumar Gupta
 Chandra Bahadur Gurung
 Dev Gurung
 Hit Kaji Gurung
 Kiran Gurung
 Kul Bahadur Gurung
 Mahadev Gurung
 Palten Gurung
 Prakash Bahadur Gurung
 Surya Man Gurung
 Tek Bahadur Gurung
 Pradip Kumar Gyawali
 Radha Gyawali
 Ram Kumar Gyawali

Back to top

H

 Sadrul Miya Haque

Back to top

J

 Anil Kumar Jha
 Arjun Prasad Joshi
 Bedanand Jha
 Bhanu Bhakta Joshi
 Chandeshwor Jha
 Dev Raj Joshi
 Govinda Raj Joshi (born 1949)
 Hari Lal Joshi
 Laxman Dutta Joshi
 Nabindra Raj Joshi (born 1964)
 Padma Jyoti
 Shiv Raj Joshi

Back to top

K

 Arjun Narasingha K.C. (born 1947)
 Chitra Bahadur K.C.
 Dipak Bahadur K.C.
 Gyanu K.C.
 Nilam K.C.
 Tanka Prasad Sharma Kadel
 Yam Lal Kandel
 Birendra Kumar Kanudiya
 Dipak Karki
 Ram Karki (born 1956)
 Sushila Karki (born 1952)
 Kailash Nath Kasudhan
 Rajendra Kumar KC
 Gauri Shankar Khadka
 Hari Bahadur Khadka
 Bishal Khadka
 Narayan Khadka
 Shankar Bahadur Khadka
 Jhala Nath Khanal (born 1950)
 Raju Khanal
 Prakash Koirala
 Shashanka Koirala
 Shekhar Koirala
 Sujata Koirala
 Sushil Koirala (1939–2016)
 Narendra Bahadur Kunwor
 Sher Bahadur Kunwor
 Chinak Kurmi
 Dan Bahadur Kurmi

Back to top

L

 Dil Bahadur Lama (1930–2014)
 Mani Lama
 Tirtha Bahadur Lama
 Ramesh Lekhak
 Bishwodip Lingden Limbu
 Hari Raj Limbu
 Purna Kumar Sharma Limbu
 Til Kumar Menyangbo Limbu
 Prakash Chandra Lohani

Back to top

M

 Balaram Gharti Magar
 Onsari Gharti Magar
 Suresh Ale Magar
 Krishna Bahadur Mahara
 Chandra Maharjan
 Ram Saran Mahat 
 Muga Lal Mahato
 Rajendra Mahato (born 1958)
 Chandra Prakash Mainali (born 1951)
 Keshav Prasad Mainali
 Radha Krishna Mainali (born 1946)
 Kali Bahadur Malla
 Sapana Pradhan Malla
 Suresh Malla
 Ram Bir Manandhar
 Farmulha Mansur
 Farmulla Mansur
 Chandra Lal Meche
 Salma Khatoon Mikrani
 Ishwar Dayal Mishra
 Hasina Miya
 Muhammad Okil Musalman

Back to top

N

 Mahendra Narayan Nidhi
 Bimalendra Nidhi
 Farmud Nadaf
 Basanta Kumar Nemwang
 Kul Prasad Nepal
 Madhav Kumar Nepal (born 1953)
 Kedar Neupane
 Lekh Nath Neupane
 Mukunda Neupane

Back to top

O

 Om Prasad Ojha
 Puskar Nath Ojha
 Sarbadev Ojha
 Khadga Prasad Oli (born 1952)

Back to top

P

 Pradip Paudel
Bal Chandra Poudel (born 1961)
 Binda Pandey (born 1966)
 Mahendra Bahadur Pandey
 Mohan Prasad Pandey
 Shanker Prasad Pandey
 Som Prasad Pandey
 Surendra Pandey
 Raghuji Pant
 Sunil Babu Pant
 Urbadutta Pant
 Hari Parajuli
 Tilak Pariyar
 Vishwendraman Pashwan
 Ananta Prasad Paudel (born 1962)
 Bishnu Prasad Paudel
 Govinda Paudel
 Kashi Paudel
 Narayan Sharma Paudel
 Rameshwor Phuyal
 Aananda Pokharel
 Giriraj Mani Pokharel
 Pushpa Raj Pokharel
 Bidhyanath Pokhrel 
 Laxmi Prasad Pokhrel
 Ram Chandra Pokhrel
 Shankar Pokhrel (born 1964)
 Prakash Sharma Poudel
 Purusottam Poudel
 Ram Chandra Poudel
 Bhimsen Das Pradhan
 Sahana Pradhan (1927–2014)
 Surya Prasad Pradhan
 Sunil Prajapati
 Barsaman Pun
 Narayan Singh Pun (died 2008)

Back to top

R

 Arjun Rai
 Mohammad Estiyak Rai
 Sher Dhan Rai
 Purna Prasad Rajbansi
 Madhukar Shamshere Rana
 Dhyan Govinda Ranjit
 Lal Bahadur Rawal
 Nagendra Kumar Ray
 Top Bahadur Rayamajhi
 Sarala Regmi
 Ganesh Prasad Rijal
 Minendra Rijal
 Hari Roka
 Jun Kumari Roka
 Keshar Man Rokka
 Mahendra Kumar Raya

Back to top

S

 Dila Sangraula
 Ambika Sanwa
 Agni Sapkota (born 1958)
 Bidur Prasad Sapkota
 Golchhe Sarki
 Narayan Prakash Saud
 Abhishek Pratap Shah (born 1982)
 Ajaya Pratap Shah
 Bhakta Bahadur Shah
 Bharat Kumar Shah
 Binod Kumar Shah
 Gobinda Bahadur Shah
 Jagya Bahadur Shahi
 Astalaxmi Shakya
 Dama Kumari Sharma
 Dilli Raj Sharma
 Janardhan Sharma
 Uma Kant Sharma
 Kripasur Sherpa
 Gopal Man Shrestha
 Jog Meher Shrestha
 Narayan Kaji Shrestha
 Shashi Shrestha
 Arjun Jang Bahadur Singh
 Baban Singh
 Ganesh Man Singh
 Harka Bahadur Singh
 Kunwar Inderjit Singh (1906–1982)
 Prakash Man Singh
 Prem Bahadur Singh
 Prem Lal Singh
 Lila Kumari Bagale Somai
 Sukra Raj Sonyok (born 1936)
 Jhakku Prasad Subedi
 Purna Kumari Subedi
 Ram Hari Subedi
 Sita Subedi
 Dal Bahadur Sunar
 Sushila Swar
 Bijay Subedi

T

 Sher Bahadur Tamang
 Surya Man Dong Tamang
 Ram Krishna Tamrakar
 Sebaki Devi Das Tatma
 Romy Gauchan Thakali
 Rhidya Ram Thani
 Amar Bahadur Thapa
 Chandra Bahadur Thapa
 Gagan Thapa
 Karna Bahadur Thapa
 Ram Bahadur Thapa
 Surya Bahadur Thapa (1928–2015)
 Bishnu Prasad Chaudhari Tharu
 Indrajit Tharu
 Mangal Prasad Tharu
 Puran Rana Tharu
 Sant Kumar Tharu
 Santa Kumar Tharu
 Ram Chandra Tiwari
 Hridayesh Tripathi
 Damber Dhoj Tumbahamphe

Back to top

U

 Dip Kumar Upadhaya
 Amod Prasad Upadhyay (born 1936)
 Kul Prasad Uprety

Back to top

Y

 Chitra Lekha Yadav
 Dinesh Chandra Yadav
 Omprakash Yadav
 Radhe Chandra Yadav
 Ram Ayodhya Prasad Yadav
 Ram Baran Yadav (born 1948)
 Renu Kumari Yadav
 Upendra Yadav (born 1960)
 Hisila Yami (born 1959)

Back to top

References

 
Politicians